A Broadway original cast album for the musical Kinky Boots was released on May 28, 2013, less than two months after the show opened on Broadway. It was produced by Cyndi Lauper, who wrote the songs, Stephen Oremus, the orchestrator and conductor, and William Wittman. On release it premiered at number one on the Billboard Cast Albums Chart and number fifty-one on the Billboard 200 chart, making it the highest charting Broadway cast recording since The Book of Mormons album was released two years earlier. Vocalists on the album include Stark Sands, Billy Porter and Annaleigh Ashford, .

Before the album's release and the show's Chicago tryout beginning in October 2012, the song "Sex Is in the Heel" became the first Broadway song to reach the top 10 of the Billboard club charts in 25 years. "Land of Lola" was released as a dance remix by Wayne G. & LFB in June 2013.

Reception
The album received a favorable review in Playbill from Steven Suskin and won the Grammy Award for Best Musical Theater Album.

References

External links 
 

Cast recordings
2013 soundtrack albums
Cyndi Lauper
Grammy Award for Best Musical Theater Album